The League of Ireland Shield is a defunct Irish football tournament which was introduced when the League of Ireland started in 1921 and ran uninterrupted until 1972.  It was played before the league season began and was seen as the third most important trophy in Irish football, after the league and FAI Cup. The winners of the Shield gained entry to the following season's Inter-Cities Fairs Cup until 1971–72.

It was played in a variety of formats; from complete round robin series to group stages followed by knock out games to complete knock out tournaments.  It was replaced by the League of Ireland Cup in 1973, though returned for one season in 1983–84.

The LOI Shield should not be confused with the League of Ireland First Division Shield, a competition that ran in the 1980s and 1990s and, as the name suggests, was confined to First Division clubs.

List of winners

Performance by club

See also
League of Ireland
FAI Cup
League of Ireland Cup

External links
LOI Shield history on rsssf.com

Defunct association football competitions in the Republic of Ireland
Defunct association football cup competitions in the Republic of Ireland
Shield